Newag 6Dg is a diesel powered shunter locomotive, modernised by Newag from the locomotive SM42 series by Fablok. The locomotive has a Caterpillar C27 diesel engine, which reduces emissions in accordance with the standards required since 2009. It is equipped with a microprocessor control system and remote control. Compared to the SM42 series, the locomotive appears completely different.

History

The 6D locomotive was meant not only as a shunter but also for running passenger trains and light freight. The old SM42 design however, dates back to the 1960s and has notable drawbacks due to poor visibility from driver's cab and the V engine which caused noise and vibrations. Over the 30-year production period the locomotive did not have any significant upgrades. The advantage was the excellent traction which was achieved by a8C22 engine at low RPM. There were attempts to modernise the structure in the 1990s, but these did not go beyond the prototype stage (SM42-2000). Only in 2007 Newag Nowy Sącz had prepared a draft for a total modernisation of the SM42 class. This included a high RPM, turbocharged diesel engine coupled with an AC generator in place with a dynamo.

In the railway world the locomotive is called Kiosk due to its streamline and box type structure.

Operators

References

Standard gauge locomotives of Poland
Diesel locomotives of Poland